The 1941 Virginia Cavaliers football team was an American football team represented the University of Virginia as an independent during the 1941 college football season. In their fifth year under head coach Frank Murray, the Cavaliers compiled an 8–1 record and outscored opponents by a total of 279 to 42. They played their home games at Scott Stadium in Charlottesville, Virginia.

Halfback Bill Dudley was the team captain. Dudley became the school's second ever consensus first-team All-American, being selected by five of nine selectors, including the Associated Press. Dudley led the country in touchdowns, points scored, rushing average, and touchdowns responsible for. He became the school's first and only recipient of the Maxwell Award, distinguishing him as the best player in college football in 1941. He finished fifth in voting for the Heisman Trophy.

Schedule

References

Virginia
Virginia Cavaliers football seasons
Virginia Cavaliers football